Central Valley High School, often referred to as "CV", is a high school located in Spokane Valley, Washington.  Central Valley is one of the three high schools in Central Valley School District #356.

History
Central Valley High School was originally built in 1927 where Greenacres Middle School currently sits.

Athletics

Football

In the 2000-2001 season the CV Bears became state champions after beating South Kitsap in the Tacoma Dome on 12/6/2001 under the direction of their long time coach Rick Giampietri. They made the playoffs in the 1982–1983, 1983–1984, 1995–1996, 2008–2009, and the 2011–2012 seasons but they fell short of the state title in each occasion.

Women's Basketball
The Central Valley Women's Basketball team has won six state titles, all in the 4A Class. Their first came in the 1992–1993 season when they beat Snohomish on 3/13/93 by a score of 44–35.

They then went to the playoffs eight years in a row from the 1996–1997 season through the 2003–2004 season, winning two more state championships in the 2000–2001 season and 2001–2002 season by beating Redmond 71–48 on 3/10/2001 and Prairie 61–43 on 3/9/2002.

Central Valley made the playoff five years in a row from 2015-2016 season through 2019-2020 season, winning three more state championships in the  2015-2016 season, 2017-2018 season and the 2019-2020 season by beating Snohomish 57-48 on 3/5/2016, Woodinville 70-39 on 3/3/2018, and	Woodinville	59-55 on  3/7/2020.

Central Valley won the GEICO National Championship in 2018, beating Hamilton Heights (Chattanooga, Tennessee) by a score of 66–61.

Men's Basketball
The CV Men's Basketball team has been to the playoffs 24 times in their history, winning their only state title in the 1967–1968 season by beating Lincoln 62–48 on 3/23/1968.

Women's Soccer
The CV Women's Soccer team has been to the playoffs nine times winning two state championships in the 2013–2014 season and the 2014–2015 season beating Issaquah 3–2 on 11/23/2013 and beating Jackson 5–2 in the 2014–2015 season.

Wrestling
The CV Wrestling team has been to the playoffs 16 times winning their only state title in the 1997–1998 season.

Cross Country
The CV Cross Country team has experienced success in recent years. In 2006, the Bears placed at state for the first time in over 40 years, and earned a ranking as 24th in the nation on Harrier's Super 25. The team won their first WIAA State Cross Country Meet in 2012. Since then, an incoming freshman team in 2015 seemed to breath life back into the team. The new freshman class was ranked second in the nation. They have placed second back-to-back at the WIAA State Cross Country Meet in 2016 and 2017. After placing second in second in 2017, they proceeded to win NIKE Cross Regionals and advanced to nationals. The team has produced two state champions: Pete Whitford in 1968 and Ryan Kline in 2017.

Notable alumni
 Chuck Bennett, class of 1966, Mayor of Salem, Oregon; former Oregon State Representative
 Will Davis, class of 2008, former NFL cornerback for the Baltimore Ravens
 Mike Hollis, class of 1990, Former NFL placekicker for Jacksonville Jaguars
 Tyler Johnson, NHL forward for the Chicago Blackhawks
 Jeff Jordan, NFL running back for Los Angeles Rams
 Ryan Looney, class of 1994, Head Men's Basketball Coach at Idaho State University
 Austin Rehkow, former NFL punter for New York Giants
 Scott Wise, class of 1978, winner of the 1989 Tony Award for Best Featured Actor in a Musical

See also

Education in Spokane, Washington

References

High schools in Spokane County, Washington
Spokane Valley, Washington
Public high schools in Washington (state)